A bronze statue of Daniel C. Jackling by Avard Fairbanks is installed outside the Utah State Capitol in Salt Lake City, in the U.S. state of Utah.

References

External links

 

Bronze sculptures in Utah
Monuments and memorials in Utah
Outdoor sculptures in Salt Lake City
Sculptures of men in the United States
Statues in Utah
Utah State Capitol
Sculptures by Avard Fairbanks